Diego Tardelli Martins (born 10 May 1985), known as Diego Tardelli, is a Brazilian professional footballer who plays as a forward. He is considered a dynamic player due to his speed on attack and individual skills. Tardelli is not his last name, but his second name: it was chosen by his father after his footballing idol, Italian World Cup winner Marco Tardelli.

Club career

Early career
Born in Santa Bárbara d'Oeste, São Paulo, Tardelli began his career at a company club in Curitiba called Partner Football. He was loaned to Santos in 2000, but was released after trying to steal chocolate milk from the club's cafeteria. He subsequently joined hometown side União Barbarense, where he impressed enough to move to São Paulo in 2003. At the latter club, Tardelli was initially known as Dinei, a former forward of Corinthians, as he also painted his hair of a blond color.

São Paulo
Tardelli made his first team debut for São Paulo on 9 July 2003, coming on as a second-half substitute for Rico in a 2–0 Série A away win over Coritiba. He scored his first goal four days later, netting his team's second in a 3–1 win at Fluminense.

Tardelli subsequently established himself as a regular starter, but was separated from the squad in 2004 for 45 days after arriving late on a training session. He returned to the squad after manager Cuca was replaced by Émerson Leão, and started the 2005 season with ten goals in the first ten matches of the club. After Leão left for the Japanese football, Tardelli's form dropped and he was again separated from the squad in October 2005, after arriving drunk on a training session.

Loans to Betis, São Caetano and PSV
On 12 December 2005, Tardelli agreed to a loan move to La Liga side Real Betis for the remainder of the 2005–06 campaign. He made his debut abroad the following 11 January, starting in a 0–0 home draw against RC Celta de Vigo, for the season's Copa del Rey.

After 15 goalless appearances, Tardelli returned to Brazil and joined São Caetano on loan on 12 July 2006. On 30 August, however, he moved to Eredivisie club PSV in a season-long loan deal.

Tardelli also struggled to feature regularly at PSV, and returned to Tricolor in July 2007, where he appeared sparingly for the club and lifted the 2007 Série A.

Flamengo
On 15 January 2008, São Paulo announced the transfer of Tardelli to Flamengo, after the club paid US$ 1 million for his federative rights. After initial controversies with teammate Souza, he was often used as a substitute, but still scored the winning goals in the Taça Guanabara and Campeonato Carioca finals, both against Botafogo.

Tardelli was unable to establish himself as a first-choice, and was mainly a backup option to Souza and Obina. He also saw his playing time limited due to an arm injury in August which left him sidelined for three months.

Atlético Mineiro
Tardelli left Flamengo on 12 January 2009, and subsequently signed for fellow league team Atlético Mineiro. At Galo, he scored a career-best 39 goals in his first campaign, being the nation's top goalscorer overall; highlights included a hat-trick in a 6–0 Campeonato Mineiro home routing of Uberaba on 8 April.

Tardelli continued to score in a prolific manner the following seasons, and scored another hat-trick in a 6–0 thrashing of Ituiutaba on 28 March 2010. He played his 100th match for the club on 30 October 2010, in a match against Botafogo.

On 12 February 2011, Tardelli scored a hat-trick in a 4–3 away win against fierce rivals Cruzeiro, but was sent off late in the match.

Anzhi Makhachkala
On 8 March 2011, Tardelli completed a move to Russian side Anzhi Makhachkala following an in-depth medical examination at the Dagi's pre-season training base. The club reportedly paid €7.5 million for his services on a four-year deal. He started in only seven games during the whole campaign, and failed to find the net in his 13 appearances. He was also strongly linked with a move back to his homeland after struggling to adapt to life in Russia.

Al-Gharafa
On 10 January 2012, Tardelli announced that he had put pen to paper on a two-and-a-half-year deal with Qatari side Al-Gharafa. His transfer fee was reported at €7 million.

Tardelli made his debut on 20 January 2012, missing a penalty kick 30 minutes after coming on as a substitute in a 2–0 loss against Al Khor. On his second-ever AFC Champions League match, he scored a brace in order to salvage a draw against Al-Hilal FC on 21 March.

Return to Atlético Mineiro
On 18 January 2013, Tardelli rejoined Atlético Mineiro on loan until the 2014 FIFA World Cup. The value of the negotiation was undisclosed. On 27 January, Tardelli confirmed the negotiations were nearly over, only waiting for a new player to arrive at his current club and by 31 January, the negotiation is complete and he joined Atlético Mineiro. Finally, on 2 February 2013, Alexandre Kalil, president of Atlético, announced the return of Tardelli. The deal is around €5.25 million with a four-year contract.

Tardelli was a regular starter for Galo during his first season, helping the club to a first-ever Copa Libertadores title and being the second-best goalscorer in the campaign with 18 goals, only one behind Jô. He also lifted the Recopa Sudamericana and the Copa do Brasil with the side in the following year, scoring goals in both tournaments' finals.

Shandong Luneng
On 17 January 2015, Tardelli joined Chinese club Shandong Luneng. On 14 February 2015, he made his official debut in the 2015 Chinese FA Super Cup against Guangzhou Evergrande Taobao.

On 13 July 2015, Tardelli scored two goals in a match against Shijiazhuang Ever Bright. A regular starter, he impressed during the 2018 Chinese Super League after scoring 17 goals.

Grêmio
On 12 February 2019, Tardelli joined Brazilian club Grêmio on a three-year contract. On 16 January 2020, after being severely criticized by the club's supporters and president, he terminated his contract.

Second return to Atlético Mineiro
On 12 February 2020, Tardelli joined Atlético Mineiro for the third time on a free transfer. In July, he suffered an ankle injury which sidelined him for the remainder of the year; he returned to action in February 2021.

Tardelli left the club in May of the following year, as his contract was due to expire.

Santos
On 23 August 2021, Tardelli signed a contract with Santos until the end of the year, with an option to extend it for a further five months. On 10 December, after one goal in 13 appearances, he departed the club.

International career
Tardelli was called up by Brazilian coach Dunga on 28 July 2009 for a friendly match against Estonia in Tallinn on 12 August. This was his first ever call up to the Brazil national team. On 11 May 2010, he was called up to the 2010 FIFA World Cup squad as one of the seven backup players.

In October 2013, in a great shape playing for Atlético Mineiro, Tardelli said on being left out from manager Luiz Felipe Scolari international squad, "Now, again, football professionals have asked my calling up. I did not give up yet, I keep working, who knows about Brazilian team is Felipão [Scolari] or who is inside there can watch my phase." On 11 October 2014, in the 2014 Superclásico de las Américas in Beijing, he scored both goals of a 2–0 victory against Argentina.

On 28 May 2015, Tardelli was included in Brazil's 23-man squad for the 2015 Copa América by coach Dunga. On 15 October 2017, he was called by manager Tite to games against Bolivia and Chile.

Career statistics

Club

International

International goals
Scores and results list Brazil's goal tally first.

|-
| 1. || rowspan="2"| 11 October 2014 || rowspan="2"| Beijing National Stadium, Beijing, China || rowspan="2"|  ||  || rowspan="2" style="text-align:center;" | 2–0 || rowspan="2"| 2014 Superclássico das Américas ||rowspan="2"| 
|-
| 2. || 
|-
| 3. || 7 June 2015 || Allianz Parque, São Paulo, Brazil ||  ||  ||  || Friendly ||
|}

Honours

Club
São Paulo
 Campeonato Paulista: 2005
 Copa Libertadores: 2005
 Campeonato Brasileiro Série A: 2007

PSV
 Eredivisie: 2006–07

Flamengo
 Taça Guanabara: 2008
 Campeonato Carioca: 2008

Atlético Mineiro
 Campeonato Mineiro: 2010, 2013, 2020, 2021
 Copa Libertadores: 2013
 Recopa Sudamericana: 2014
 Copa do Brasil: 2014

Al-Gharafa
 Emir of Qatar Cup: 2012

Shandong Luneng
 Chinese FA Super Cup: 2015

Grêmio
 Campeonato Gaúcho: 2019

International
Brazil
 Superclásico de las Américas: 2014

Individual
 Campeonato Brasileiro Série A Team of the Year: 2009, 2014
 Campeonato Brasileiro Série A top goalscorer: 2009
 Arthur Friedenreich Award: 2009

References

External links
 
 
 

1985 births
Living people
People from Santa Bárbara d'Oeste
Association football forwards
Association football midfielders
Brazilian footballers
Brazilian people of Italian descent
Brazil youth international footballers
Brazil under-20 international footballers
Brazil international footballers
Brazilian expatriate footballers
São Paulo FC players
Real Betis players
Associação Desportiva São Caetano players
PSV Eindhoven players
CR Flamengo footballers
Clube Atlético Mineiro players
FC Anzhi Makhachkala players
Al-Gharafa SC players
Shandong Taishan F.C. players
Grêmio Foot-Ball Porto Alegrense players
Santos FC players
Campeonato Brasileiro Série A players
Eredivisie players
La Liga players
Russian Premier League players
Qatar Stars League players
Chinese Super League players
Expatriate footballers in the Netherlands
Expatriate footballers in Spain
Expatriate footballers in Russia
Expatriate footballers in Qatar
Expatriate footballers in China
Brazilian expatriate sportspeople in the Netherlands
Brazilian expatriate sportspeople in Spain
Brazilian expatriate sportspeople in Russia
Brazilian expatriate sportspeople in Qatar
Brazilian expatriate sportspeople in China
2015 Copa América players
Footballers from São Paulo (state)